The Murciélagos Fútbol Club B was a Mexican soccer team, played in the Segunda División in Guamúchil, Sinaloa, Mexico and are the official reserve team for Murciélagos F.C. The games are held in the city of Guamúchil in the Estadio Alfredo Díaz Angulo. In 2017, the team changed its name to Pacific F.C.

References

Football clubs in Sinaloa
Segunda División de México